Daniel Paul Halafihi Forrest (born 23 October 1984) is an English football coach and former professional player who played as a winger and a forward.

Playing career
Born in Keighley, Forrest began his career at Bradford City, where he was described as a "promising striker." He joined the club at the age of 9 during the same week as Kevin Sanasy. He made 50 appearances in the Football League for Bradford City, including scoring on his Football League debut.

He signed on loan for Halifax Town in August 2005, before signing permanently later that year. At Halifax Town he spent a loan spell at Hucknall Town in 2008 to regain fitness following an injury. He signed for Crawley Town in May 2008, signing a new contract with the club in May 2009. He was offered another contract by the club in April 2010, but he moved to Barrow in June 2010. While at Barrow he spent a loan spell at Guiseley in January 2011. He was released by Barrow in May 2011, joining Guiseley on a permanent deal. He left Guiseley in September 2012, and played for Harrogate Town before moving to Bradford Park Avenue in July 2013. After a short spell back with Guiseley, his third with the club, he signed for Gainsborough Trinity in November 2014, leaving the club in November 2015, retiring from football.

Coaching career
He returned to football in March 2016 with Silsden, as a player-assistant manager, scoring on his debut. He became manager in November 2016, and led the club to promotion from the North West Counties League First Division in the 2017–18 season.

He left Silsden in June 2022, to become assistant manager at Guiseley. He became interim manager in November 2022 after Danny Ellis was sacked, but left the club later that month after Paul Phillips was appointed the new manager.

Personal life
He is friends with Mark Trueman.

Career statistics

References

1984 births
Living people
Sportspeople from Keighley
English footballers
English Football League players
National League (English football) players
Bradford City A.F.C. players
Halifax Town A.F.C. players
Hucknall Town F.C. players
Crawley Town F.C. players
Barrow A.F.C. players
Guiseley A.F.C. players
Harrogate Town A.F.C. players
Bradford (Park Avenue) A.F.C. players
Gainsborough Trinity F.C. players
Silsden A.F.C. players
Association football forwards
Association football wingers
English football managers
Guiseley A.F.C. managers